Pelochrista tibetana is a species of moth of the family Tortricidae. It is found in China (Tibet, Sichuan).

References

Moths described in 1939
Eucosmini